The 1985–86 FIBA European Cup Winners' Cup was the twentieth edition of FIBA's 2nd-tier level European-wide professional club basketball competition, contested between national domestic cup champions, running from 1 October 1985, to 18 March 1986. It was contested by 22 teams, two more than in the previous edition.

Defending champions FC Barcelona, defeated Scavolini Pesaro in the final, which was held in Caserta, to win its second trophy. They became the third team to successfully defend its title. It was the third title in a row for a Spanish League team.

Participants

First round

|}

Second round

|}

Automatically qualified to the Quarter finals group stage
 FC Barcelona (title holder)
 CSKA Moscow

Quarterfinals

Semifinals

|}

Final
March 18, PalaMaggiò di Castel Morrone, Caserta

|}

References

External links
 1985–86 FIBA European Cup Winner's Cup @ linguasport.com
FIBA European Cup Winner's Cup 1985–86

FIBA
FIBA Saporta Cup